Storkvammen Cirque is a cirque between Eidsgavlen and Kvamsgavlen Cliffs on the east side of the Humboldt Mountains, in Queen Maud Land. It was discovered and photographed by the German Antarctic Expedition, 1938–39, and mapped and named Storkvammen by Norway from air photos and surveys of the Norwegian Antarctic Expedition, 1956–60.

Cirques of Queen Maud Land
Humboldt Mountains (Antarctica)